WJDA (1300 AM) is a radio station in Quincy, Massachusetts, serving the Boston area with a Reggaeton format. The station’s studios are in Chelsea.

History
The station began in 1947 as a local station for the South Shore region, owned by James D. Asher, and later by his son Jay. For much of its history, WJDA provided talk programming and (in its last years) ABC Radio's Unforgettable Favorites satellite soft AC format, operating under the branding "Radio your way." Among its on-air personalities were Herb Fontaine, Roy Lind, Joe Catalano, Win Bettinson, Ken Coleman, Don Kent and Mike Logan. Notable shows included Party Line, Breakfast with WJDA and the Wax Museum. The station was a daytimer for most of its history, broadcasting until sundown, but became 24-hour in the early 1990s.

The station (and its North Shore sister station WESX) was sold in 2006 to Principle Broadcasting, which switched the station to the current format and closed the local studios.  Its final day of operation under the old format was April 30, 2006.

Tropical Storm Irene toppled the station's tower on August 28, 2011; the station was off the air for a few days, then received FCC approval for a temporary long-wire antenna.  In April 2012, the tower was restored.

In 2017, the Principle Broadcasting Network sold its stations — WJDA, WESX, and WLIE in Islip, New York — to Universal Stations for $2.3 million; Universal's principals were also associated with Principle. Universal Stations sold WJDA and WESX to Real Media Group effective August 9, 2018.

References

External links

JDAa
Radio stations established in 1947
Quincy, Massachusetts
Mass media in Norfolk County, Massachusetts
1947 establishments in Massachusetts
Reggaeton radio stations